Nina Grigoryevna Otkalenko (née Pletnyova; ; 23 May 1928 – 13 May 2015) was a Soviet middle-distance runner. She won a European title in the 800 m at the inaugural 1954 European Athletics Championships and set multiple world records in this event in 1951–54. She missed the 1952 and 1956 Olympics, where women's middle-distance events were not part of the program, and the 1960 Olympics due to an injury.

In the 1950s Otkalenko became the most successful record breaker in the women's 800 m event. Starting with a world record of 2:12.0 minutes in 1951, she went on to improve her own 800 metres world record four more times. Spearheading a significant improvement in women's times in the event over her career, her last world record of 2:05.0 minutes in 1955 stood for almost five years, before it was beaten by her compatriot Lyudmila Shevtsova. She ranked number one in the world in the 800 m every year from 1951 to 1958, bar 1956 and 1957 when she ranked second to Lyudmila Lysenko and Yelizaveta Yermolayeva. She also set world records in the pre-IAAF era, with a 400 m record of 55.5 in 1954 and a 1500 m record of 4:37.0 minutes in 1952.

Outside of her European title, she won medals at the World Festival of Youth and Students, twice winning the 800 m title in 1953 and 1955, as well as taking 400 metres silver medals at both those championships. She was highly successful in domestic competition, ending her career with a total of 22 Soviet titles in track and field and cross country disciplines.

International competitions

References

External links

 Profile(archived)
  Nina Otkalenko's profile in the Modern Museum of Sports includes photos of her and her awards and decorations



1928 births
2015 deaths
Sportspeople from Kursk
Russian female middle-distance runners
Soviet female middle-distance runners
European Athletics Championships medalists
World record setters in athletics (track and field)